Franco Cittadini is an Italian film producer. He produced La più grande rapina del West (1967), Soldati e capelloni (1967) and Sugar Colt (1966) with Stenio Fiorentini.

Filmography
 I quattro del pater noster (1969)
 Soldati e capelloni (1967)
 Halleluja for Django (1967)
 Sugar Colt (1966)

References

Bibliography

External links
 

Italian film producers